Rheumapterini is a tribe of geometer moths under subfamily Larentiinae.

Genera
 Coryphista Hulst, 1896
 Euriphosa
 Hospitalia  Agenjo, 1950
 Pareulype Herbulot, 1951
 Rheumaptera Hübner, 1822
 Triphosa Stephens, 1829
 Xenospora

References

 (2011). "A morphological review of tribes in Larentiinae (Lepidoptera: Geometridae)". Zootaxa. , 3136: 1–44.

External links

 
Larentiinae